Taeniotes chapini is a species of beetle in the family Cerambycidae. It was described by Dillon and Dillon in 1941. It is known from Bolivia, Ecuador and Peru.

References

chapini
Beetles described in 1941